26 Draconis is a triple star system in the constellation Draco, located 46 light years from the Sun. Two of the system components, A and B, form a spectroscopic binary that completes an orbit every 76 years. The composite spectral classification of the AB pair is G0V, which decomposes to individual spectral types F9V and K3V. A 1962 study estimated the masses of these two stars as 1.30 and 0.83 times the mass of the Sun, respectively. The stars are considered moderately metal-poor compared to the Sun, which means they have a lower proportion of elements other than hydrogen or helium.

Gliese 685 

The third component, GJ 685, is a red dwarf spectral classification of M0V.  As of 1970, this star is separated by 737.9 arc seconds from the AB pair and they share a common proper motion. The Star GJ 685 has one known planet orbit that was detected by radial velocity. 

The space velocity components of 26 Draconis are U = +36.5, V = −4.3 and W = −21.8 km/s. This system may be a member of the Ursa Major moving group.

References

Triple star systems
G-type main-sequence stars
K-type main-sequence stars
M-type main-sequence stars
Solar-type stars
Draco (constellation)
Durchmusterung objects
Draconis, 26
0684
160269
086036
6573